James Herron may refer to:

 James Hervey Herron (1875–1948), American mechanical and consulting engineer
 James P. Herron (1894–1967), American football player and coach